Vafessa Fofana (born 12 June 1992) is a French-Ivorian basketball player. He plays for the French League side BCM Gravelines-Dunkerque and the Ivory Coast national basketball team.

Club career
In 2009, Fofana started his club career with the Cholet Basket under 21 at the age of 17, he averaged 4.3 points, 2.8 rebounds and 0.3 blocks. In his second season at Cholet Basketball Under 21, he averaged 9.3 points, 3.5 rebounds and 0.6 blocks. In his third season at the Cholet Basketball Under 21, he averaged 13.4 points, 4 rebounds and 0.6 blocks.

In 2012, he played for the Saint-Vallier basketball team where he averaged 1.8 points, 1.6 rebounds and 0.3 blocks. In 2013, he played for the Denain Voltaire Basket where he averaged 4.1 points, 2.7 rebounds and 0.1 blocks.

In 2016, He played for the Hermine Nantes Basket where he averaged 8 points, 4.5 rebounds and 0 blocks. In 2017, he moved to HTV Basket where he averaged 6.3 points, 3.5 rebounds and 0.3   In 2018, he moved back to Hermine Nantes Basket where he averaged 9.9 points, 5.1 rebounds and 0.4 blocks.
In 2019, He moved back to Cholet Basket.

On June 23, 2021, he has signed with BCM Gravelines-Dunkerque of LNB Pro A.

Ivorian National team
Fafona represents the Ivory Coast national basketball team. He participated at 2019 FIBA Basketball World Cup where he averaged 3.2 points, 2.6 rebounds and 2.4 assist. He also played with his country at FIBA AfroBasket 2021, helping the team win the silver medal. He averaged 12 points and 10.7 rounds per game over the tournament.

References

1992 births
Living people
Basketball players from Paris
BCM Gravelines players
Black French sportspeople
Cholet Basket players
Citizens of Ivory Coast through descent
Denain Voltaire Basket players
French men's basketball players
French sportspeople of Ivorian descent
Hermine Nantes Basket players
HTV Basket players
Ivorian expatriate basketball people in France
Ivorian men's basketball players
Saint-Vallier Basket Drôme players